Gorakh Hill is a hill station of Sindh, Pakistan.

Tourism 

The Hill station attracts thousands of tourists from the city.

Etymology
The name Gorakh is derived from the Sindhi language in which, word "Gorakhnath" refers to a popular Hindu Saint associated with the deity Shiva and that Balochi-language word "Gurkh" is later dialectic adaptation of Sindhi-language word Gorakh. but there is no connection of Persian Gurg and Balochi Gurkh means wolf with word of Sindh language. It is believed that the name is derived from original Word Gorakh either of Sanskrit or Sindhi language which means very difficult and intricate.

History
Different opinions have been given about the history and origin of the hill station. It is said that the medieval Hindu saint, Gorakhnath, had extensively wandered in hills and the region. According to Nandu, an authority on Sanskrit, Gorakh is a Sanskrit word which means "shepherding of sheep, cow and goat, etc."

The Gorakh Hill has been important centre of Hindu pilgrimage due to sanctification by Guru Gorakhnath, a saint who is said to have established a temple of Lord Shiva here.

Geography
The area is part of the Kirthar Mountain Range that makes the border between Sindh and Baluchistan provinces in Pakistan.

Nightlife

Gorakh Hill Station is known for its nightlife, specially Bonfire setup.

Climate
Gorakh's elevation gives it a special climate, with sub-zero temperatures during winter and generally below  in summer, with about 120 mm of average annual rainfall. The Government of Sindh is in the process of constructing a new road from Dadu to Gorakh Hill. There is a new rest house for visitors on the hill. Tourists can arrange their own transport from Sehwan Sharif to the hill station.

Gallery

See also 
 Bado Hill Station

References

External links 

 Gorakh Hills Development Authority

Mountains and hills of Sindh
Dadu District
Hill stations in Pakistan